Daniil Medvedev defeated Andy Murray in the final, 6–4, 6–4 to win the singles tennis title at the 2023 ATP Qatar Open. It was his second ATP Tour title in as many weeks. En route to the final, Murray saved eight match points - three in his first-round match against Lorenzo Sonego and five in the semifinals against Jiří Lehečka.

Roberto Bautista Agut was the defending champion, but lost in the second round to Christopher O'Connell.

Seeds
The top four seeds received a bye into the second round.

Draw

Finals

Top half

Bottom half

Qualifying

Seeds

Qualifiers

Lucky loser

Qualifying draw

First qualifier

Second qualifier

Third qualifier

Fourth qualifier

References

External links
Main draw
Qualifying draw

Qatar ExxonMobil Open - 1
Qatar Open (tennis)